The Japanese science fiction manga series , written and illustrated by Kou Yaginuma, was adapted into a 20-episode anime series in 2003 and a 7-episode live-action series in 2009. All three productions tell a coming-of-age story of teenager Asumi Kamogawa as she trains to become an astronaut at a fictional space academy in the near future.

Japanese animation studio Group TAC produced Twin Spica'''s anime adaptation, which was broadcast by NHK. The series premiered on November 1, 2003, and aired until its conclusion on March 27, 2004. Tomomi Mochizuki directed the anime series, and Rika Nakase wrote its screenplay. Masako Goto designed the characters for animation. When the series reached its conclusion, fewer than 30 chapters of the manga had been published. Chapter 25, which concludes the story of Asumi and her classmates undergoing a test of their survival skills, was the final chapter to be adapted for the anime. Consequently, the series concludes prematurely with Asumi's ghost companion Lion-san leaving when he no longer has anything to teach her and her friends. The manga, however, continues with Lion-san appearing in subsequent chapters and ended serialization on August 5, 2009. The anime series also aired in Japan, other parts of Asia, and Latin America on Animax. The song "Venus Say" by female pop musical group Buzy (band) was used as the opening theme. Male pop group Begin adapted Kyu Sakamoto's 1963 single  as the ending theme.

NHK announced a live-action Twin Spica adaptation on March 30, 2009, produced in cooperation with the Japan Aerospace Exploration Agency, the country's national aerospace agency. Sixteen-year-old actress Nanami Sakuraba was cast for the role of Asumi Kamogawa. Filming for the series began on April 2, and it was scheduled to air on June 11 but was eventually postponed by one week until June 18. The series aired weekly on NHK General TV and NHK BS Hi-Vision until its conclusion on July 30. Screenplay for the series was written by Shūko Arai and Daigo Matsui. While writing the script, Arai found himself encouraged by the characters who must overcome various struggles in order to achieve their dreams. He also specified hopes and dreams as central themes in the story. Among the changes made in this adaptation is the removal of Lion-san as a central character. Alternative rock band Orange Range's 2009 single  was used as the ending theme.

The anime adaptation was released in both VHS and DVD formats by King Records. Both were released in five compilation volumes containing four episodes each. A special DVD collection containing the five flashback episodes—episodes 1, 5, 9, 12, and 16—from the anime was released on May 26, 2004, and a five-disc DVD box set was released on July 22, 2004. A three-disc DVD compilation box set of the live-action adaptation will be released by Geneon Universal Entertainment on December 23, 2009.

Episode list

Anime (2003/04)
Five of the anime's 20 episodes are told as flashbacks that explore events in Asumi Kamogawa's childhood. The anime series opens with an adaptation of Kou Yaginuma's debut work . The anime adapts the manga's story up to chapter 25, but chapters introducing Kiryū as an additional character are not included in this production.

Drama (2009)
Unlike the anime, flashbacks are only used sparingly in the live-action adaptation. While the story remains true to the primary plot points of the manga, several characters were changed for this production. The removal of Lion-san'' as a central character that contributes to Asumi's growth and the modification to Marika Ukita's background story are particular examples. Additionally, while the manga spans the four years during which Asumi attends school, the main story in this production spans only several months from the time of their entry into the school in April until their first summer.

See also
List of Twin Spica chapters

Footnotes

External links
Anime
Twin Spica on animation studio Group TAC's website 
Twin Spica anime on broadcaster NHK's website 
Twin Spica anime on music distributor Starchild's website 

Live-action
Twin Spica live-action series on broadcaster NHK's website 

Twin Spica
Twin Spica